Dichomeris pyrrhopis is a moth in the family Gelechiidae. It was described by Edward Meyrick in 1922. It is found in Amazonas, Brazil.

The forewings are ferruginous orange, in males sprinkled with ferruginous and the costa suffused with ferruginous. The hindwings in males are dark fuscous, towards the base more or less variably suffused orange. The hindwings of the females are greyish orange.

References

Moths described in 1922
pyrrhopis